Dominikus Zimmermann (30 June 1685, Gaispoint – 16 November 1766, Wies) was a German Rococo architect and stuccoist.

Life

Dominikus Zimmermann was born in Gaispoint near Wessobrunn in 1685 and became a Baumeister (Architect) and a stuccoist. His older brother Johann Baptist Zimmermann was an architect and a frescoist. Working together they produced masterpieces such as the church at Steinhausen. Dominikus Zimmermann descended from a family of artists and craftsmen belonging to the so-called Wessobrunner School, worked first as a stuccoist and later as a master builder and architect. He lived in Landsberg am Lech, where he was mayor between 1748–53. He died near the pilgrims' church in Wies near Steingaden in 1766.

Principal works
Abbey church, Mödingen (1716–1725) in the district of Dillingen
Old town hall (1719) and St John's Church (1752) in Landsberg am Lech
Pilgrimage church in Steinhausen near Bad Schussenried (1728–1733)
Church of Our Lady in Günzburg (1735–1740)
Pilgrimage church in Wies near Steingaden (1745–54)

External links

 

1685 births
1766 deaths
18th-century German architects
Rococo architects
People from Weilheim-Schongau
Bavarian architects
Architects of Roman Catholic churches